Dr. Kavita "Vita" Rao is a fictional character, a geneticist appearing in American comic books published by Marvel Comics. She is part of the X-Men Series.

Shohreh Aghdashloo portrayed the role in X-Men: The Last Stand.

Publication history
Dr. Kavita Rao first appeared and featured prominently in the first story arc of the monthly series Astonishing X-Men Vol. 3 #1 in 2004 and was created by Joss Whedon and John Cassaday.

Fictional character biography

Hope
Dr. Kavita Rao is a world-renowned geneticist from India who developed a serum (later called "Hope") which could "cure" mutants, turning them into normal humans. She explains that she regards the mutant gene as a 'corruption' of healthy tissue, and justifies her research by looking at mutants who committed suicide or hurt others because of their powers, such as a female mutant with a butterfly-like appearance or Tildie Soames (a child whose nightmares can manifest into monsters).

Hundreds of mutants immediately signed up for the procedure at Benetech (the corporate backer of her research). The X-Men debated the merits of the cure and the significance of labelling the mutant condition a disease.  The chance at shedding his "beastly" appearance and avoiding any further secondary mutations held significant appeal for Hank McCoy (aka Beast) and he considered taking the serum for a time, although Wolverine objected by saying that an X-Man taking the serum would be the equivalent of admitting that there was something to 'cure' in the first place.

It was later revealed that Rao had been working for the alien Ord of the Breakworld, who also had in his custody Colossus (who was, at that time, thought to be dead, but had been resurrected by Ord's technology). The X-Men defeated Ord and Benetech, and Ord was delivered into the hands of S.H.I.E.L.D. Dr. Rao's work was destroyed by Wolverine, leaving Hank with the last sample of "Hope", although he remains uncertain whether or not he will use it at some point.

Endangered Species 
Kavita Rao was pictured alongside several super-villains to whom Beast offers to 'sell his soul' for a means to un-do the effects of M-Day. With her old research into 'curing' the mutant gene now irrelevant after so many mutants lost their powers, she agrees to aid Beast in his quest and is now looking for more info that might help him.

X-Club
After Beast has finished gathering his science squad, they head back to base where he introduces them to their final member, Kavita Rao. Together they hold a meeting where he explains everything about how the Decimation occurred. When Beast proposes they go back in time to obtain the DNA sample of the parents of a mutant, Kavita questions why they must all go when Beast says it's one of the perks of the job. She travels back with the rest of the X-Club and Psylocke to the year 1906. There she helps look over Catherine Bradley after injuring herself during the Hellfire Club's assassination attempt. During the events of Utopia, she helps raise Asteroid M from the bottom of the ocean and attends the funeral of Dr. Yuriko Takiguchi when he passes away.

In the aftermath of Utopia, Karma and Magik are requested to see Kavita Rao to inform her of their foray into Legion's mind. When Kavita mistakes Marci, a young girl who was absorbed into Legion's mind, for one of his personalities, Karma corrects her and reveals that Marci was a real person but that Legion revealed Marci doesn't have a body to return to and explains how his powers work.

Second Coming
When Cable and Hope Summers return to the present, Bastion begins to set his plan in motion in exterminating the mutant race. Thanks to the New Mutants, they discover he has erected towers in certain points around San Francisco. Cyclops sends the X-Club to investigate. Upon arriving on one of his oil platforms where one of these towers is located, they come across a timer which goes off.

Kavita's life flashes before her eyes and when the timer hits zero they end up transported to a dystopian future where they meet a now human Hank McCoy, who warns them to keep Kavita safe at all costs. Hank reveals that Hope Summers powers grew out of control and he needs Kavita to recreate her Hope serum to stop her from creating the future they see before them. After some convincing, Kavita reveals she kept an encrypted copy of the formula on her Mala bracelet and they go to Utopia to take out Hope.

Arriving on Utopia it is revealed that the dystopian future is a lie created by Graydon Creed using holographic hard-light technology.  Kavita revealing she knew of the deception, didn't recreate the Hope serum but instead an unstable pyrovirus instead which causes the oil platform to explode. The X-Club get out in time only to see the dome envelope Utopia and the citizens of San Francisco. Later they work with the Avengers and Fantastic Four in trying to bring the dome down.<ref>Uncanny X-Men #525</ref>

Curse of the Mutants
Following the events of Second Coming, Kavita is seen with Doctor Nemesis checking on Jubilee after a vampire suicide bomber infects her with a virus manufactured to turn her into a vampire. While the rest of the X-Men meet to discuss the vampire problem, Kavita goes to check on Jubilee only to be knocked unconscious. The X-Science team, in a later attempt to fight the encroaching threat of vampirism, get locked down in the labs with a vampire and five people infected at the same time as Jubilee. With the assistance of the White Queen, the Science Team and some of the infectees survive. Madison kills the vampire.

Other versions
Age of X
In the "Age of X" reality, Kavita Rao is branded as a traitor to humanity for allying with the mutants, helping Wolverine eliminate an anti-mutant toxin.

In other media
Television
 Kavita Rao appears in the Wolverine and the X-Men episode "Battle Lines". She has been watching over a box containing Tildie Soames before being knocked out by Mystique disguised as Colonel Moss.

Film
 In the 2006 movie X-Men: The Last Stand'', Kavita Rao was played by Iranian actress Shohreh Aghdashloo. As she signed without a completed script, in an interview shortly after signing Aghdashloo mistakenly said she would instead be playing Dr. Cecilia Reyes. In the film, Rao helps with the invention of the mutant cure — although Angel's father is the one who delivers the speech justifying the cure as a corruption of healthy tissue — which she created with the DNA of Leech. Toward the end of the movie, she alongside Dr. Worthington are targeted by a trio of Omegas consisting of Kid Omega, Arclight, and Psylocke. As Worthington is dragged off, Kid Omega grabs her in a bear hug, says everything will be all right and pierces her with his body spikes.

References

Fictional geneticists
Comics characters introduced in 2004
Fictional female scientists
Marvel Comics female characters
Marvel Comics film characters
Marvel Comics scientists
Fictional Indian people
Female characters in film
Characters created by Joss Whedon